The 2020–21 Toulouse FC season was the club's 84th season in existence and its first season back in the second division of French football. In addition to the domestic league, Toulouse participated in this season's edition of the Coupe de France. The season covered the period from 1 July 2020 to 30 June 2021.

Players

First-team squad

Out on loan

Transfers

Out

Pre-season and friendlies

Competitions

Overview

Ligue 2

League table

Results summary

Results by round

Matches
The league fixtures were announced on 9 July 2020.

Promotion play-offs

Coupe de France

Statistics

Goalscorers

References

External links

Toulouse FC seasons
Toulouse